Harshani Shashikala Kumarasinghe (born 1984) is a Sri Lankan archer. She competed at the 2010 Asian Games in the archery event.

Shashikala Kumarasinghe also returned to represent the national archery team in an international competition after 7 years by participating in the 2016 South Asian Games.

See also 
 Sri Lanka at the 2010 Asian Games
 Archery at the 2010 Asian Games

References

External links 
 Profile at rcherz.com
 Profile at World Archery

1984 births
Living people
Sri Lankan female archers
Archers at the 2010 Asian Games
Asian Games competitors for Sri Lanka
20th-century Sri Lankan women
21st-century Sri Lankan women